Thomas Gladstones (3 June 1732 – 12 May 1809) was a Scottish flour merchant and philanthropist. He was the father of Sir John Gladstone and the grandfather of the British prime minister William Ewart Gladstone.

Early life 
Born at the farm of Mid Toftcombs in the parish of Biggar, Lanarkshire, Thomas Gladstones was the fourth son of John Gladstones (c.1696–1757), a miller and farmer at Mid Toftcombs. John Gladstones also served as an elder of Biggar Kirk. Thomas's elder brother, James, was a Church of Scotland minister and rector of Leith Academy.

In 1746, when he was aged 14, Thomas's father arranged for him to be apprenticed to Alexander Somerville, a wine merchant in Leith. When Thomas completed his apprenticeship he decided that the corn trade offered better prospects than did wine, and he established himself in Leith as a provision merchant and corn dealer, eventually trading at both wholesale and retail.

He died in 1809 at his home on Coalhill in Leith.

Marriage and family 
On 21 April 1762, Gladstones married Nelly Neilson (1738–1806), the daughter of Walter Neilson, a merchant from Springfield near Edinburgh. They had sixteen children together, the second-born, and eldest son, being Sir John Gladstones.

Career 
Thomas Gladstones' corn business prospered during the 1760s. His business operated from a shop at the front of his house on Coalhill in Leith. Thomas became the lessee of the Dalry paper mill, where he appointed his brother-in-law, James Murray, as superintendent. He also bought and sold grain from the Baltic ports, was an investor in a Leith whaling syndicate, owned a number of trading ships, and had an interest in the sulfuric acid plants at Barrowmuirhead, near Leith. His provisions business focused on provisioning ships with butter, oranges, wine, vinegar and other goods.

Thomas Gladstones was a Whig and an elder in the Church of Scotland. He died at his home in Leith in May 1809, aged 86. He was buried in the churchyard of North Leith Parish Church.

See also 
Gladstone baronets

References 

 Checkland, S.G. The Gladstones: A Family Biography 1764–1851 (1971)

1732 births
1809 deaths
Thomas
People from Biggar, South Lanarkshire
People from Leith
Scottish merchants
18th-century Scottish businesspeople
19th-century Scottish businesspeople
Scottish philanthropists
18th-century philanthropists